Alison Hecnary González Esquivel (born 31 January 2002) is a Mexican professional footballer who plays as a forward for Club America of the Liga MX Femenil.

Club career
A native of Tepic, Nayarit, González began playing in Liga MX Femenil with Tigres UANL during 2018. She helped the club win the 2017–18 Clausura tournament, and finish runner's-up in the 2018–19 Apertura tournament, scoring eleven goals in 22 matches.

Gónzalez joined Tigres' Liga MX rivals Atlas F.C. for the 2018–19 Clausura tournament, where she formed an effective striking partnership with Mexico international Adriana Iturbide. The pair scored 35 league goals during 2019, including a González hat-trick against Atlético San Luis in their Liga MX debut.

Tigres UANL Femenil
On May 5, 2018, Tigres UANL Femenil finished as Champions of Clausura 2018

International career

Mexico U-17 

On June 12, 2018, Mexico U-17 women's national football team finished as Runners-up at the 2018 CONCACAF Women's U-17 Championship.

On December 1, 2018, Mexico U-17 women's national football team finished as Runners-up at the 2018 FIFA U-17 Women's World Cup.

Mexico U-20 

On March 8, 2020, Mexico U-20 women's national football team finished as Runners-up at the 2020 CONCACAF Women's U-20 Championship.

International goals

Honours
Tigres UANL Femenil
Liga MX Femenil: Champions: Clausura 2018
Mexico U-17
 CONCACAF Women's U-17 Championship: Runners-up: 2018
 FIFA U-17 Women's World Cup: Runners-up: 2018
Mexico U-20
 CONCACAF Women's U-20 Championship: Runners-up: 2020

Personal life
Alison's nickname is "Aligol." She has a twin sister.

References

External links 
 

2002 births
Living people
Sportspeople from Tepic, Nayarit
Footballers from Nayarit
Mexican women's footballers
Women's association football forwards
Tigres UANL (women) footballers
Atlas F.C. (women) footballers
Liga MX Femenil players
Mexico women's international footballers
21st-century Mexican women
Mexican footballers